Electronic warfare (EW) is any action involving the use of the electromagnetic spectrum (EM spectrum) or directed energy to control the spectrum, attack an enemy, or impede enemy assaults. The purpose of electronic warfare is to deny the opponent the advantage of—and ensure friendly unimpeded access to—the EM spectrum. EW can be applied from air, sea, land, and/or space by crewed and uncrewed systems and can target communication, radar, or other military and civilian assets.

The electromagnetic environment
Military operations are executed in an information environment increasingly complicated by the electromagnetic spectrum. The electromagnetic spectrum portion of the information environment is referred to as the electromagnetic environment (EME). The recognized need for military forces to have unimpeded access to and use of the electromagnetic environment creates vulnerabilities and opportunities for electronic warfare in support of military operations.

Within the information operations construct, EW is an element of information warfare; more specifically, it is an element of offensive and defensive counterinformation.

NATO has a different and arguably more encompassing and comprehensive approach to EW. A military committee conceptual document from 2007 (MCM_0142 Nov 2007 Military Committee Transformation Concept for Future NATO Electronic Warfare) recognised the EME as an operational maneuver space and warfighting environment/domain. In NATO, EW is considered to be warfare in the EME. NATO has adopted simplified language which parallels those used in other warfighting environments like maritime, land, and air/space. For example, an electronic attack (EA) is offensive use of EM energy, electronic defense (ED), and electronic surveillance (ES). The use of the traditional NATO EW terms, electronic countermeasures (ECM), electronic protective measures (EPM), and electronic support measures (ESM) has been retained as they contribute to and support electronic attack (EA), electronic defense (ED) and electronic surveillance (ES). Besides EW, other EM operations include intelligence, surveillance, target acquisition and reconnaissance (ISTAR), and signals intelligence (SIGINT). Subsequently, NATO has issued EW policy and doctrine and is addressing the other NATO defense lines of development.

Primary EW activities have been developed over time to exploit the opportunities and vulnerabilities that are inherent in the physics of EM energy. Activities used in EW include electro-optical, infrared and radio frequency countermeasures; EM compatibility and deception; radio jamming, radar jamming and deception and electronic counter-countermeasures (or anti-jamming); electronic masking, probing, reconnaissance, and intelligence; electronic security; EW reprogramming; emission control; spectrum management; and wartime reserve modes.

Subdivisions
Electronic warfare consists of three major subdivisions: electronic attack (EA), electronic protection (EP), and electronic warfare support (ES).

Electronic attack 

Electronic attack (EA), also known as electronic countermeasures (ECM), involves the offensive use of electromagnetic energy weapons, directed energy weapons, or anti-radiation weapons to attack personnel, facilities, or equipment with the intent of degrading, neutralizing, or destroying enemy combat capability including human life. In the case of electromagnetic energy, this action is most commonly referred to as "jamming" and can be performed on communications systems or radar systems. In the case of anti-radiation weapons, this often includes missiles or bombs that can home in on a specific signal (radio or radar) and follow that path directly to impact, thus destroying the system broadcasting.

Electronic protection 

Electronic protection (EP), also known as an electronic protective measure (EPM) or electronic counter-countermeasure (ECCM) are a measure used to protect against an electronic enemy attack (EA) or to protect against friendly forces who unintentionally deploy the equivalent of an electronic attack on friendly forces. (sometimes called EW fratricide). The effectiveness of electronic protection (EP) level is the ability to counter an electronic attack (EA).

Flares are often used to distract infrared homing missiles from missing their target. The use of flare rejection logic in the guidance (seeker head) of an infrared homing missile to counter an adversary's use of flares is an example of EP. While defensive EA actions (jamming) and EP (defeating jamming) both protect personnel, facilities, capabilities, and equipment, EP protects from the effects of EA (friendly and/or adversary). Other examples of EP include spread spectrum technologies, the use of restricted frequency lists, emissions control (EMCON), and low observability (stealth) technology.

Electronic warfare self-protection (EWSP) is a suite of countermeasure systems fitted primarily to aircraft for the purpose of protecting the host from weapons fire and can include, among others: directional infrared countermeasures (DIRCM, flare systems and other forms of infrared countermeasures for protection against infrared missiles; chaff (protection against radar-guided missiles); and DRFM decoy systems (protection against radar-targeted anti-aircraft weapons).

An electronic warfare tactics range (EWTR) is a practice range that provides training for personnel operating in electronic warfare. There are two examples of such ranges in Europe: one at RAF Spadeadam in the northwest county of Cumbria, England, and the Multinational Aircrew Electronic Warfare Tactics Facility Polygone range on the border between Germany and France. EWTRs are equipped with ground-based equipment to simulate electronic warfare threats that aircrew might encounter on missions. Other EW training and tactics ranges are available for ground and naval forces as well.

Antifragile EW is a step beyond standard EP, occurring when a communications link being jammed actually increases in capability as a result of a jamming attack, although this is only possible under certain circumstances such as reactive forms of jamming.

In November 2021, Israel Aerospace Industries announced a new electronic warfare system named Scorpius that can disrupt radar and communications from ships, UAVs, and missiles simultaneously and at varying distances.

Electronic warfare support 

Electronic warfare support (ES) is a subdivision of EW involving actions taken by an operational commander or operator to detect, intercept, identify, locate, and/or localize sources of intended and unintended radiated electromagnetic (EM) energy.  These Electronic Support Measures (ESM) aim to enable immediate threat recognition focuses on serving military service needs even in the most tactical, rugged, and extreme environments.  This is often referred to as simply reconnaissance, although today, more common terms are intelligence, surveillance and reconnaissance (ISR) or intelligence, surveillance, target acquisition, and reconnaissance (ISTAR). The purpose is to provide immediate recognition, prioritization, and targeting of threats to battlefield commanders.

Signals intelligence (SIGINT), a discipline overlapping with ES, is the related process of analyzing and identifying intercepted transmissions from sources such as radio communication, mobile phones, radar, or microwave communication. SIGINT is broken into two categories: electronic intelligence (ELINT) and communications intelligence (COMINT). Analysis parameters measured in signals of these categories can include frequency, bandwidth, modulation, and polarization.

The distinction between SIGINT and ES is determined by the controller of the collection assets, the information provided, and the intended purpose of the information. Electronic warfare support is conducted by assets under the operational control of a commander to provide tactical information, specifically threat prioritization, recognition, location, targeting, and avoidance. However, the same assets and resources that are tasked with ES can simultaneously collect information that meets the collection requirements for more strategic intelligence.

History
The history of electronic warfare goes back to at least the beginning of the 20th century. The earliest documented consideration of EW was during the Russo-Japanese War of 1904–1905. The Japanese auxiliary cruiser Shinano Maru had located the Russian Baltic Fleet in Tsushima Strait, and was communicating the fleet's location by "wireless" to the Imperial Japanese Fleet HQ. The captain of the Russian warship Ural requested permission to disrupt the Japanese communications link by attempting to transmit a stronger radio signal over the Shinano Maru's signal, hoping to distort the Japanese signal at the receiving end. Russian Admiral Zinovy Rozhestvensky refused the advice and denied the Ural permission to electronically jam the enemy, which in those circumstances might have proved invaluable. The intelligence the Japanese gained ultimately led to the decisive Battle of Tsushima. The battle was humiliating for Russia. The Russian navy lost all its battleships and most of its cruisers and destroyers. These staggering losses effectively ended the Russo-Japanese War in Japan's favor. 4,380 Russians were killed and 5,917 were captured, including two admirals, with a further 1,862 interned.

During World War II, the Allies and Axis Powers both extensively used EW, or what Winston Churchill referred to as the "Battle of the Beams". Navigational radars had gained in use to vector bombers to their targets and back to their home base. The first application of EW in WWII was to defeat those navigational radars. Chaff was also introduced during WWII to confuse and defeat tracking radar systems.

As time progressed and battlefield communication and radar technology improved, so did electronic warfare. Electronic warfare played a major role in many military operations during the Vietnam War. Aircraft on bombing runs and air-to-air missions often relied on EW to survive the battle, although many were defeated by Vietnamese ECCM.

As another example, in 2007, an Israeli attack on a suspected Syrian nuclear site during Operation Outside the Box (or Operation Orchard) used electronic warfare systems to disrupt Syrian air defenses while Israeli jets crossed much of Syria, bombed their targets, and returned to Israel undeterred. The target of the flight of 10 F-15 aircraft was a suspected nuclear reactor under construction near the Euphrates River modeled after a North Korean reactor and supposedly financed with Iranian assistance. Some reports say Israeli EW systems deactivated all of Syria's air defense systems for the entire period of the raid, infiltrating the country, bombing their target and escaping.

In December 2010, the Russian army received their first land-based Army operated multifunctional electronic warfare system known as Borisoglebsk 2 developed by Sozvezdie. Development of the system started in 2004 and evaluation testing successfully completed in December 2010. The Borisoglebsk-2 brings four different types of jamming stations into a single system with a single control console, helping the operator make battlefield decisions within seconds. The Borisoglebsk-2 system is mounted on nine MT-LB armored vehicles and is intended to suppress mobile satellite communications and satellite-based navigation signals. This EW system is developed to conduct electronic reconnaissance and suppression of radio-frequency sources. Newspaper, Svenska Dagbladet, said its initial usage caused concern within NATO. A Russian blog described Borisoglebsk-2 thus:

During the first two days of the 2022 Russian invasion of Ukraine, Russian EW disrupted Ukraine's air defense radars and communications, severely disrupting Ukrainian ground-based air defense systems. Russian jamming was so effective in fact that it interfered with their own communications, so efforts were scaled back. This led to Ukrainian SAMs regaining much of their effectiveness, and they began inflicting significant losses on Russian aircraft by the start of March. Rapid Russian advances at the start of the war prevented EW troops from properly supporting them, but they had deployed extensive jamming infrastructure by late March and April. EW complexes were set up in the Donbas in concentrations of up to 10 complexes per  of frontage. Electronic suppression of GPS and radio signals caused heavy losses of Ukrainian UAVs, depriving them of intelligence and precise artillery fire spotting. Small quadcopters had an average life expectancy of around three flights, and larger fixed-wing UAVs like the Bayraktar TB2 had a life expectancy of about six flights. By summer 2022, only some one-third of Ukrainian UAV missions could be said to have been successful, and EW had contributed to Ukraine losing 90% of the thousands of drones it had at the beginning of the invasion.

In popular culture
In the movie Spaceballs, an electronic attack "jams" a weapons system with a literal jar of jam. In both Top Gun: Maverick and Behind Enemy Lines, characters utilize chaff and flares from their F-18s to confuse/deflect guided missiles.

See also 
 Cyberwarfare
 Electromagnetic pulse
 Electromagnetic interference
 Electronic harassment
 Ivan's hammer
 L3Harris Technologies
 Suppression of Enemy Air Defenses (SEAD)

Other electronic warfare systems:
 ADM-160 MALD
 Krasukha (electronic warfare system)
 Radar warning receiver (RWR)
 Samyukta electronic warfare system
 Sky Shadow (radar)
Historic:
 36th Electronic Warfare Squadron
 55th Wing
 Battle of Latakia: the first recorded use of deception EW in a naval battle
 No. 100 Group RAF
U.S. specific:
 Association of Old Crows
 DARPA
 Electronic warfare officer
 Fleet Electronic Warfare Center
 Joint Functional Component Command – Network Warfare
 National Electronics Museum
 U.S. Marine Corps Radio Reconnaissance Platoon
 USACEWP (United States Army Computer Network Operations-Electronic Warfare Proponents )

References

Citations

Sources 

 
 
The Changing Capability of Manpack Electronic Warfare Systems 
 Carlo Kopp. "Electronic Warfare in Operation Desert Storm", Australian Aviation, June/July/August, 1993
Association of Old Crows 
Electronic Warfare Jamming Systems 
Information Warfare, Information Operations and Electronic Attack on APA
Electronic Warfare Products
Air Force Instruction on Electronic Warfare (EW) Operations (PDF)

Further reading 
 EW 101: A First Course in Electronic Warfare; David Adamy; 2001; .
 EW 102: A Second Course in Electronic Warfare; David Adamy; 2004; .
 Deception in War; Jon Latimer; 2001; .
 FM 3-36: Electronic Warfare In Operations. Safeguarding Soldiers Through Technology. Fort Leavenworth, U.S. Army Combined Arms Center  (CAC), 26 February 2009 – PDF, 114 p., 4,5 MB. See also: John Milburn: Army manual raises emphasis on electronic warfare. The Washington Post, 26 February 2009.
 
 

 
Warfare by type
Information operations and warfare